The New York Software Industry Association (NYSIA) is a trade association for software, information technology, and Web development companies in the New York City area. NYSIA's mission is to promote and support the growth of this industry in this region.

NYSIA runs an extensive educational event schedule, hosts the yearly New York Software Summit, sponsors a wide variety of economic development programs aimed at assisting member companies, and carries out legislative work on behalf of the software industry.

External links
 Official website

Business organizations based in the United States
Information technology organizations based in North America